Iris narcissiflora is a plant species in the genus Iris, it is also in the subgenus Iris and in the section Pseudoregelia.  It is a rhizomatous perennial, from China. It has pale green, thin, sword-shaped leaves, medium-long slender stem and 1 yellow flower. It is cultivated as an ornamental plant in temperate regions.

Description
It has short, fibrous rhizomes. That has secondary roots or slender stolons.

They do not have a midvein. The deciduous leaves, disappear in winter or after flowering.

The stem has 2 purplish-green, lanceolate spathe (leaves of the flower bud).

The stems hold 1 terminal (top of stem) flower, blooming between April and May.

It has a perianth tube that is 3 – 4 mm long.

Like other irises, it has 2 pairs of petals, 3 large sepals (outer petals), known as the 'falls' and 3 inner, smaller petals (or tepals), known as the 'standards'.
In the centre of the petal, is a narrow, sparse beard. The standards are narrow and ovate (oval-like) shaped, they are 2.8 cm long and 1.6 cm wide.
 
It has 1.3 cm long stamens, 1.5 cm long ovary. It has a 1.5 cm long and 8 mm wide, spreading  style branch, that has irregularly toothed lobes.

After the iris has flowered, it produces a seed capsule between June and August.

Biochemistry
As most irises are diploid, having two sets of chromosomes, this can be used to identify hybrids and classification of groupings.
Nothing has been reported currently as of August 2015, about a chromosome count of the iris.

Taxonomy
It is commonly known as narcissus iris.

It is written as 水仙花鸢尾 in Chinese script, and known as shui xian hua yuan wei in Pidgin.

The Latin specific epithet narcissiflora refers to having narcissus-like flowers.

It was first published and described by Friedrich Ludwig Emil Diels in 'Svensk Botanisk Tidskrift' (Svensk Bot. Tidskr.) in Vol.18 on page 428 in 1924.

It was verified by United States Department of Agriculture and the Agricultural Research Service on 4 April 2003, then updated on 3 December 2004.

It is listed in the Encyclopedia of Life.

Distribution and habitat
It is native to temperate Asia.

Range
It is found in China, within the province of Sichuan.

Habitat
It grows in forests, at the edge of forests and in hillside grasslands and meadows.

Cultivation
It is hardy, to RHS Zone H7. Meaning colder than −20 °C (or < -4 °F).
 
It prefers to grow in well-drained soils, in sun or partial shade.

It takes time for the plant get established in new planting sites.

It is a rare plant in Europe.

In some herbariums and Botanical Gardens, specimens labelled as Iris narcissiflora have later been re-classified as Iris dolichosiphon.

Toxicity
Like many other irises, most parts of the plant are poisonous (rhizome and leaves), and if mistakenly ingested can cause stomach pains and vomiting. Also, handling the plant may cause skin irritation or an allergic reaction.

References

Sources
 Mathew, B. 1981. The Iris. 180.
 Waddick, J. W. & Zhao Yu-tang. 1992. Iris of China.
 Wu Zheng-yi & P. H. Raven et al., eds. 1994–. Flora of China (English edition).

External links
 Has an image of the iris in flower

narcissiflora
Endemic flora of China
Flora of Sichuan
Garden plants of Asia
Plants described in 1924